Zylofuramine  is a stimulant drug. It was developed in 1961, and was intended for use as an appetite suppressant and for the treatment of senile dementia in the elderly, but there is little information about it and it does not appear to have ever been marketed.

Its chemical structure has a similarity to other N-ethyl substituted stimulant drugs such as ethylamphetamine and N-Ethylhexedrone.

References 

Stimulants
Tetrahydrofurans
Phenethylamines
Norepinephrine-dopamine releasing agents